Kevin St. Jarre (born July 26, 1968) is an American teacher, author, and former soldier.

Personal life
Born on July 26, 1968 in Pittsfield, Massachusetts, Kevin St. Jarre grew up in Madawaska, Maine.  He graduated from Madawaska High School in 1986.  St. Jarre earned his Bachelor of Science from the University of Maine at Fort Kent in 1997, and his Master of Fine Arts from the University of Southern Maine in 2010.

, St. Jarre was married to Jennifer , and had three children: Sophia (born ), Dmitri (born ), and Derek (born ).   Kevin St. Jarre was living in Cape Elizabeth, Maine.

Career
St. Jarre served in the United States Army from 1986–1992, working in military intelligence with the 1st Armored Division during Operation Desert Storm.  After his enlistment, he was elected to the Madawaska, Maine board of selectmen as well as town manager of Grand Isle, Maine.  From 1998, he worked for Aprisma Management Technologies at the corporate level.

Education
Since 1997 through at least 2020, St. Jarre has been teaching, either at universities or high schools, including at Caribou High School (1997–1998), Noble High School (2003–2005), Fort Kent Community High School (2005–2010), Massabesic High School (2010–2014), University of Maine at Farmington (2013–2016), and Cape Elizabeth High School (2014at least 2020).

Writing
A writer since childhood, St. Jarre's first sale was to his father for ten cents.  St. Jarre has typically been a writer of historical fiction and thrillers.

In 2005–2006, he published a three-volume series of military-thriller novels with characters based on his friends and coworkers: Night Stalkers, Night Stalkers: Coercion, and Night Stalkers: Homefront were respectively released in January 2005, July 2005, and January 2006.  St. Jarre used the pen name Michael Hawke because he didn't want to be typecast by that type of fiction.

His novel Aliens, Drywall, and a Unicycle, published on November 6, 2020, is a character piece about a New Hampshirite divorcé and the unusual people he meets in his new apartment building.  St. Jarre's next book, Celestine, was planned to be a science-fiction novel released in 2021.

References

External links
 
 
 

1968 births
20th-century American male writers
21st-century American male writers
21st-century American novelists
American male novelists
American thriller writers
living people
novelists from Maine
people from Cape Elizabeth, Maine
people from Madawaska, Maine
people from Pittsfield, Massachusetts
Stonecoast MFA alumni
United States Army personnel of the Gulf War
University of Maine at Fort Kent alumni
University of Southern Maine alumni
writers from Maine